Sampige is a village and a gram panchayat in the Turuvekere taluka of the Tumkur district in Karnataka, India.

Sampige village is home to the Srinivasa Swamy Temple, which is known as "Sampige Srinivasa". Every year, the temple hosts a cart festival, which is attended by thousands of people. Several Kannada language films have been picturized at this location.

The village is named after the Kannada word for the Champak tree, and was called Champakapuri in ancient times.
Sampige Srinivasa is family deity of many Hebbar Srivaishnavas.

Villages under Sampige panchayat 

The villages under the administration of the Sampige gram panchayat include:

 Kodipalya
 Gundi Kaval
 Yeladabagi
 Masthigondanahalli
 Veerasagara Kere Kaval
 Singasandra
 Sampige (main village)
 Veerasagara
 Joddikoppa
 Halugondanahalli
 Raghavadevanahalli
 Akkalasandra
 Tovinakere

References

See also
 Tumkur
 Tumkur District

Villages in Tumkur district